Ghost Dance is a 1983 British film directed by Ken McMullen. This independent film explores the beliefs and myths surrounding the existence of ghosts and the nature of cinema.

Plot
Through the experiences of two women in Paris and London, Ghost Dance offers an analysis of the complexity of our conceptions of ghosts, memory and the past. It is an adventure film strongly influenced by the work of Jacques Rivette and Jean-Luc Godard but with a unique intellectual and artistic discourse of its own and it is this that tempts the ghosts to appear, for Ghost Dance is permeated with all kinds of phantasmal presence. The film focuses on philosopher Jacques Derrida who considers ghosts to be the memory of something which has never been present. This theory is explored in the film. 
This film has also been compared with the following works: Celine and Julie Go Boating, Thelma & Louise, O Lucky Man, Sans Soleil, Week End, and Viva Maria.

Cast
Leonie Mellinger
Pascale Ogier
Robbie Coltrane
Jacques Derrida
Dominique Pinon
John Annette
Stuart Brisley
Barbara Coles

Crew
Producer - Ken McMullen
Writer - Ken McMullen
Cinematographer  - Peter Harvey
Music  - David Cunningham, Michael Giles and Jamie Muir

External links

1983 films
1983 drama films
British independent films
Films directed by Ken McMullen
British drama films
1983 independent films
1980s English-language films
1980s British films
Biographical films about philosophers